Mary Martha Gross is an American voice actress, comedian, and actress known for her four-year stint on Saturday Night Live from 1981 to 1985. Her credits also include minor roles on  Animaniacs, Boston Legal, That's So Raven, Sabrina, the Teenage Witch, and Six Feet Under.

Early life 
Gross was born in Chicago the daughter of William Oscar Gross, a tool designer, and Virginia Ruth (née Cahill), a telephone operator. She is the younger sister of actor Michael Gross, who starred in the 1980s sitcom Family Ties. The siblings were first cousins to actor Ron Masak.

Career

Early career 
She is an alumna of the Second City comedy troupe. Before becoming part of the group she was a secretary with the American Dental Association.

Saturday Night Live (1981–1985) 
Gross joined SNL in 1981, during the show's 7th season following the show's disastrous sixth season, when the show was nearly canceled. She became co-anchor of SNL's Weekend Update segment (renamed SNL Newsbreak) during her first season. She and the rest of the cast left in 1985 following executive producer Dick Ebersol's departure from the show.

Recurring characters 
Alfalfa, from SNLs recurring parody of The Little Rascals and skits regarding the murder of Eddie Murphy's Buckwheat character.
Siobhan Cahill, an Irish woman who reports on Irish events on Saturday Night News (Weekend Update's name when Brad Hall was cast as anchor). Coincidentally, Saturday Night Live would have Siobhan Fallon and Beth Cahill as cast members in the 1990s.
Chi Chi, a Hispanic woman who hosts two fake public-access television cable TV shows (The Ghostbusters Show and Let's Watch TV) with her best friend, Consuela (played by Julia Louis-Dreyfus)
Celeste, a repressed woman married to an equally repressed man (played by Tim Kazurinsky)

Celebrity impersonations 
Ann Landers
Brooke Shields
Dr. Ruth Westheimer (Dr. Ruth)
Nancy Reagan
Paul Reubens (as Pee Wee Herman)
Eleanor Roosevelt
Geraldine Ferraro
Harriet Nelson
Irlene Mandrell
Marilyn Monroe
Mary Tyler Moore
Jeane Dixon
Mary Hart
Lena Horne
Margaret Thatcher
Simone de Beauvoir
Suzanne Somers
Leslie Uggams

Filmography

Film

Television

References

External links 

Actresses from Chicago
American film actresses
American television actresses
American voice actresses
Living people
American women comedians
American sketch comedians
Comedians from Illinois
Year of birth missing (living people)